The Eden-Farson Site is an archeological site in Sweetwater County, Wyoming. The site was a Native American campground dated to the Protohistoric period. The site is noted for the large collection of pronghorn bones, along with at least twelve lodge sites.

The site was placed on the National Register of Historic Places on September 22, 2014.

References

External links
 Eden-Farson Site at the Wyoming State Historic Preservation Office

		
National Register of Historic Places in Sweetwater County, Wyoming
Archaeological sites on the National Register of Historic Places in Wyoming